This article summarizes the events, album releases, and album release dates in hip hop music for the year 2011.

Events

January 
 Shady Records signs Slaughterhouse and Yelawolf.
 Decon Records signs Roc Marciano.

February 
 For the rap categories of the 2011 Grammy Awards, Eminem wins two Grammy Awards for Best Rap Solo Performance and Best Rap Album while Jay-Z wins Best Rap/Sung Collaboration, Best Rap Performance by a Duo or a Group, and Best Rap Song.
 Eminem pairs up with auto manufacturer Chrysler to star in a two-minute-long advertisement that aired during the 2011 Super Bowl, which was hailed by critics as being "authentic" and "rousing", and which is reported to have contributed to the boost in Chrysler's first quarter profits.

March 
 Singer Nate Dogg dies on March 15, 2011.
 Lasers by Lupe Fiasco debuts at number one on the Billboard 200, selling 204,000 copies its first week. It is the first rap album to debut at number one on the Billboard 200 in 2011.

April 
 Detroit rapper Fuzz Scoota joins the rap group D12.
 Krayzie Bone splits from Bone Thugs-N-Harmony.
 The scheduled May 16 release of Lil Wayne's Tha Carter IV is delayed.
 Dr. Dre awarded 100% of the digital royalties from his first album The Chronic in a lawsuit from Death Row Records.
 Lil B names his new album I'm Gay, sparking controversy and death threats.

May 
 M-Bone of Cali Swag District dies from multiple gun wounds in front of the liquor store in Inglewood, California.
 ”Macho Man” Randy Savage dies of a heart attack brought on by atherosclerosis in Seminole, Florida.

June 
 Lupe Fiasco stirs controversy, calling United States President Barack Obama "the biggest terrorist in America".
 Fat Joe drastically slims down 88 pounds, currently weighing 265 pounds, in reaction to the death of seven of his friends due to obesity.
 Ja Rule begins his two-year prison sentence for gun charges stemming from a 2007 arrest in New York City.
 The late Tupac Shakur's 40th birthday celebrated on June 16 at a venue in Atlanta, hosted by his mother, Afeni Shakur and comedian Mike Epps. Notable performing acts included Erykah Badu and Rick Ross, among others.
The manhunt for hip-hop record executive James "Jimmy Henchman" Rosemond ends with his arrest by US Marshals and DEA agents in NY City and a subsequent charge for heading a cocaine trafficking ring.
It is revealed that Missy Elliott is suffering from Graves' disease.
2Pac's Greatest Hits album is certified diamond by the RIAA.
Bad Meets Evil's Hell: The Sequel becomes the first group album to debut at #1 on Billboard 200, but the second hip hop act to have a #1 album in 2011.
Shawty Lo signs a deal with 50 Cent's G-Unit Records.

July
DMX is released from prison.
Wiz Khalifa's Rolling Papers is the first rap album to be certified gold in 2011.
 A Tribe Called Quest's documentary film is released in the United States, amid a much-publicized disagreement over the film's vision between Q-Tip and director Michael Rapaport.

August
Forbes publishes Hip Hop Cash Kings 2011, placing Jay-Z first ($37 million), followed by Diddy ($35 million). The rest follow as Kanye West ($16 Million), Lil Wayne ($15 Million), Birdman ($15 million), Snoop Dogg ($14 million) Eminem ($14 million), Wiz Khalifa ($11 million) Nicki Minaj ($6.5 million) and B.o.B ($5 million).
Brooklyn rapper Kampane is found dead in a suspected homicide.
Kanye West and Jay-Z's Watch the Throne becomes the  fastest-selling rap album in 2011, selling 436,000 copies its first week, beating Lupe Fiasco's third studio album Lasers. It is also the third rap album to debut at number one on the Billboard 200.
Rolling Stone names Eminem "the King of Hip Hop".
Lil Wayne rushed to a hospital in St. Louis from a skateboarding incident, suffering a wound over his eye.
In response to West and Jay-Z's single "H•A•M", Lil Wayne fires back at Jay-Z in his song "It's Good" regarding "Baby's Money".  One of the collaborators on the track Jadakiss denies involvement in the beef.  Lil Wayne states there would not be any repercussions.  Drake, the other collaborator, was unaware of the beef at the time of recording.
Rapper Royce da 5'9" releases fifth and final independent album Success Is Certain which debuts at #25 on the US Billboard Hot 200.
T.I. is released from prison.

September
Watch the Throne is certified platinum by the Recording Industry Association of America.
Pusha T of the Clipse signs a solo record deal with Def Jam Records.
Lil Wayne's Tha Carter IV sells 965,000 copies its first week, making it the fastest-selling rap album and the overall second-fastest-selling album of the year. It also becomes the fifth rap album to debut at #1 on the Billboard 200. He also has 12 singles appear on the Billboard Hot 100 in the first week of September.
T.I. was brought back to prison due to conducting business with VH1 reality show producers for his upcoming reality show, delaying his release date to late September.  Later, T.I. was released to a halfway house to complete his sentence.
Ray J and Fabolous were involved in an altercation with each other in Las Vegas, where the match between Floyd Mayweather and Victor Ortiz occurred.
Lil Wayne announced his intent to record two more Tha Carter albums, a joint album with Juelz Santana, and a second Young Money compilation album.

October
J. Cole's debut album Cole World: The Sideline Story sells 218,000 copies in its first week, charting at number one on the Billboard 200.
Rick Ross has suffered two seizures while traveling to cities to perform.
It is reported that Lil Wayne is recording sequels to I Am Not a Human Being and Rebirth.
Kanye West announces that a GOOD Music compilation album will be released sometime in spring 2012.
Rapper/Model Lola Monroe signs onto Wiz Khalifa's label Taylor Gang.

November
Brick Squad Monopoly affiliate RoseMo700 is gunned down in Los Angeles on November 3 while on his way home at the age of 26.
Legendary rapper Heavy D dies at his home in Beverly Hills, California.
Pitbull files a countersuit against Lindsay Lohan citing her multiple prison sentences lead to the credibility of the reference and her ineligibility to file her lawsuit in New York, being a California resident.
Erick Sermon suffers a heart attack.
Juicy J of Three 6 Mafia signs a solo deal with Wiz Khalifa's Taylor Gang Records.
Take Care sold 630.000 in this debut week, being the second #1 album of Drake, and the third fastest selling album of 2011 (behind Lady Gaga and Lil Wayne).

December
 Strange Music signs Prozak.
 1017 Brick Squad affiliate Slim Dunkin is shot and killed in an Atlanta studio.
 Waka Flocka Flame's second studio album Triple F Life: Friends, Fans and Family is pushed to a 2012 release date because of the death of Slim Dunkin.

Released albums

Highest first-week sales

Highest-charting singles

Number one albums in Europe

Highest critically reviewed albums

Metacritic

AnyDecentMusic?

See also
Previous article: 2010 in hip hop music
Next article: 2012 in hip hop music

References 

2010s in hip hop music
Hip hop
Hip hop music by year